Tomasz Bandrowski (born 18 September 1984 in Pyskowice) is a Polish former professional footballer who played as a midfielder.

He debuted for the Poland national team on 6 September 2008 against Slovenia.

Honours
Lech Poznań
 Ekstraklasa: 2009–10
 Polish Cup: 2008–09
 Polish SuperCup: 2009

References

External links
 
 

Living people
1984 births
People from Pyskowice
Sportspeople from Silesian Voivodeship
Association football midfielders
Polish footballers
FC Energie Cottbus players
Lech Poznań players
Jagiellonia Białystok players
Poland international footballers
Polish expatriate footballers
Expatriate footballers in Germany
Bundesliga players
2. Bundesliga players
Ekstraklasa players